Pitcairnia macranthera is a species of flowering plant in Bromeliaceae family. It is native to Ecuador.

References

macranthera
Flora of Ecuador
Taxa named by Édouard André